The Lambertville City School District is a defunct community public school district that served students in preschool through sixth grade from Lambertville, in Hunterdon County, New Jersey, United States. As of the 2014-15 school year, the school is part of the South Hunterdon Regional School District, which also serves students from Stockton and West Amwell Township.

In a special election held in September 2013, voters from Lambertville, Stockton and West Amwell Township passed referendums to dissolve the South Hunterdon Regional School District and to combine the three existing school districts from each municipality (Lambertville City School District, Stockton Borough School District and West Amwell Township School District), with majorities in each community passing both ballot items. A single combined regional district would be created, serving students in PreK-12, in which property taxes would be levied under a formula in which 57% is based on property values and 43% on the number of students. The executive county superintendent will appoint an interim board of education for the new regional district, which will be responsible for implementing the merger.

As of the 2011-12 school year, the district's one school had an enrollment of 203 students and 16.1 classroom teachers (on an FTE basis), for a student–teacher ratio of 12.61:1.

The district is classified by the New Jersey Department of Education as being in District Factor Group "FG", the fourth-highest of eight groupings. District Factor Groups organize districts statewide to allow comparison by common socioeconomic characteristics of the local districts. From lowest socioeconomic status to highest, the categories are A, B, CD, DE, FG, GH, I and J.

Public school students in seventh through twelfth grades attend the South Hunterdon Regional High School in Lambertville, part of the South Hunterdon Regional High School District, which served 372 students in southern Hunterdon County as of the 2011-12 school year. Students from Lambertville, Stockton and West Amwell Township attend South Hunterdon Regional High School.

School
The Lambertville Public School had an enrollment of 203 students as of the 2010-11 school year.

Administration
Core members of the district's administration are:
Dr. Michael G. Kozak, Superintendent
Donna Tolley, Business Administrator / Board Secretary

References

External links
 Lambertville Public School
 
 School Data for the Lambertville Public School, National Center for Education Statistics

2014 disestablishments in New Jersey
School districts disestablished in 2014
Lambertville, New Jersey
New Jersey District Factor Group FG
School districts in Hunterdon County, New Jersey